Yuri Vladimirovich Nikulin (18 December 1921 – 21 August 1997) was a Soviet and Russian actor and clown who starred in many popular films. He is best known for his roles in Leonid Gaidai's comedies, such as The Diamond Arm and Kidnapping, Caucasian Style, although he occasionally starred in dramatic roles and performed in Moscow Circus.

He was awarded the title of People's Artist of the USSR in 1973 and Hero of Socialist Labour in 1990. He also received a number of state awards, including the prestigious Order of Lenin, which he received twice in his lifetime.

Biography

Early Years
Nikulin was born just after the end of the Russian civil war, in Demidov town in Smolensk Oblast. His father Vladimir Andreyevich was a critic, an author of satirical plays and a director in Demidov local Drama theatre. Yuri’s mother Lidiya was an actress there, they got married in the early 1920s and in 1925 moved to Moscow.

In Moscow Yuri entered a prestigious school No. 16 and soon received from the school pedologist an unfavorable characteristic of “a child with limited abilities”. The insulted father came to school and confronted the teacher, proving that Yuri was a bright kid. Vladimir Nikulin led a drama club in the school, they staged contemporary playwrights and Yuri was a passionate artist there. In the eighth grade he was transferred to the school No. 346 that was considered ‘a mediocre one’. He graduated in 1939, in a few months he was called up for military duty.

World War II 

Nikulin was drafted to the Red Army on November 18, 1939, at the age of 17. In December he was sent to the Winter War with Finland in an anti-aircraft battery near Sestroretsk. During fights at the Mannerheim Line he served as a wireman and once was ordered to lay 2 km of wire from reels on a backpack in -30 °C. On that night he was so exhausted after the mission that fell asleep in the snow, fortunately rescued by the border patrol. He suffered from severe frostbites and for the rest of his life his legs froze easily. Upon recovery he returned to his division.

In 1941 Nikulin was waiting for demobilization when the German invasion of the Soviet Union began. In 1942 his battery was located near the sieged Leningrad. In 1944 he again escaped death by pure luck - a few seconds after he left a trench shelter it was hit by a heavy artillery missile. In the same year he was by commander's mistake sent to set wire in an occupied village and wasn’t killed by German soldiers only by sheer luck. Upon the end of the war he was dismissed from the army only in 1946.

Circus career 

Nikulin first tried himself as a comedian in 1944 when a political officer in his battalion, impressed by his repertoire of jokes, ordered him to organize entertainment for the division, which he did with resounding success. Encouraged, once the war ended, Nikulin unsuccessfully tried to enter VGIK, Russian Institute of Theatre Arts, Mikhail Shchepkin Higher Theatre School. Finally he was accepted into Noginsk theatre school, but soon changed his mind and entered the Moscow Сircus school.

Nikulin's style and precise delivery, as well as his mastery of timing and his hilarious masks made him an outstanding comedian. He started as an assistant of Karandash, then the most famous clown in USSR. In circus school Nikulin met Mikhail Shuidin, they formed a clown duo and performed together throughout the whole career.

In the ring, Nikulin played a phlegmatic, slow and unsmiling person, in the West he was compared to the Buster Keaton and Charlie Chaplin. Rich in mimicry, doleful of expression, Nikulin was hailed as “a brainy clown” outside Russia.

Nikulin, affectionately called "Uncle Yura" by Russian children, relied mainly upon his wits to earn his place in history as one of the best clowns of the 20th century. He stopped performing as a clown at 60, explaining that “a clown shouldn’t be gray, it looks pathetic”.

Cinema 

His screen debut came in 1958 with the film The Girl with the Guitar. He appeared in almost a dozen major features, mainly in the 1960s and 1970s, and achieved great success with short films directed by Leonid Gaidai."

The first two works with Gaidai, Dog Barbos and Unusual Cross and later Bootleggers (Russian: Samogonchiki or The Moonshine Makers, 1961), were also where Nikulin was featured as a character named Fool in The Three Stooges-like trio, along with Georgy Vitsin as Coward and Yevgeny Morgunov as Pro. In former Soviet republics he is particularly well known for his role in popular film series about the criminal trio. The series included such films as Operation Y and Shurik's Other Adventures and Kidnapping, Caucasian Style.

His most popular films include comedies The Diamond Arm, The Twelve Chairs, Grandads-Robbers. His dramatic talent revealed itself in tragic roles in Andrei Tarkovsky's Andrei Rublev and several films on World War II themes (Sergei Bondarchuk's They Fought for Their Country, Aleksei German’s Twenty Days Without War).

Family 
In 1949 Nikulin met his future spouse, Tatiana Pokroskaya, an equestrian and a student in of Timiryazev Agricultural Academy. Tatiana brought to the circus a dwarf horse, requested by Karandash. During the rehearsal that day Tatiana witnessed Yuri get run over by a horse, suffering a concussion, a fractured clavicle and had almost lost his eye. Tatiana visited him in the hospital, in six months they were married. Since then she started working in circus, participated in many of his plays, traveled with Nikulin and Shuidin. Tatiana also plays minor roles in several of Nikulin’s films.

Directorship in Tsvetnoy 

Nikulin was remembered as a person of boundless kindness. On a director’s post he rebuilt the Old Circus and established a foundation to help retired circus artists and performers.

Yuri Nikulin died on 21 August, 1997 and was buried in Novodevichy Cemetery in Moscow. He was succeeded in his office at the Moscow Circus on Tsvetnoy Boulevard by his son Maxim. After Nikulin’s death the Old Circus on Tsvetnoy Boulevard was renamed in his honor. A bronze monument to Nikulin was placed in front of the circus.

Filmography

Honors and awards

 Hero of Socialist Labour (1990)
 Order "For Merit to the Fatherland", 3rd class (1996)
 Two Orders of Lenin (1980 and 1990)
 Order of the Patriotic War, 2nd class
 Order of the Red Banner of Labour
 Order of the Badge of Honour
 Medal For Courage
Medal of Zhukov
 Medal "For Labour Valour"
 Medal "For the Defence of Leningrad"
 Medal "For the Victory over Germany in the Great Patriotic War 1941–1945"
Honored Artist of the RSFSR (1963)
People's Artist of the RSFSR (1969)
 People's Artist of the USSR (1973)
 Vasilyev Brothers State Prize of the RSFSR (1970)

References

Literature

External links

 Great Russian Clown Yuri Nikulin
 

1921 births
1997 deaths
20th-century memoirists
20th-century Russian male actors
20th-century Russian male singers
Communist Party of the Soviet Union members
Heroes of Socialist Labour
Honored Artists of the RSFSR
People's Artists of the RSFSR
People's Artists of the USSR
Recipients of the Medal "For Courage" (Russia)
Recipients of the Medal of Zhukov
Recipients of the Order "For Merit to the Fatherland", 3rd class
Recipients of the Order of Lenin
Recipients of the Order of the Red Banner of Labour
Recipients of the Vasilyev Brothers State Prize of the RSFSR
Russian clowns
Russian humorists
Russian male comedians
Russian male film actors
Russian male television actors
Russian memoirists
Russian mimes
Russian television presenters
Slapstick comedians
Soviet clowns
Soviet male film actors
Soviet male singers
Soviet memoirists
Soviet military personnel of the Winter War
Soviet military personnel of World War II
Burials at Novodevichy Cemetery